Joaquim Molins i Amat (9 February 1945 – 13 July 2017) was a Spanish politician who was a member of the Congress of Deputies and the Parliament of Catalonia. He died on 13 July 2017 of complications from pancreatic cancer.

References

1945 births
2017 deaths
Barcelona municipal councillors
Convergence and Union politicians
Deaths from pancreatic cancer
Deaths from cancer in Spain
Democratic Convergence of Catalonia politicians
Members of the 1st Congress of Deputies (Spain)
Members of the Parliament of Catalonia
Members of the 2nd Congress of Deputies (Spain)
Members of the 5th Congress of Deputies (Spain)
Members of the 6th Congress of Deputies (Spain)
Public works ministers of Catalonia
Polytechnic University of Catalonia alumni